Clarence MacGregor (September 16, 1872 – February 18, 1952) was a Republican member of the United States House of Representatives from New York.

Life
MacGregor was born in Newark, New York. He graduated from Hartwick Seminary in 1893. He was a member of the New York State Assembly (Erie Co., 8th D.) in 1908, 1909, 1910, 1911 and 1912.

He was elected as a Republican to the 66th, 67th, 68th, 69th and 70th United States Congresses, holding office from March 4, 1919, until his resignation on December 31, 1928.

He was a justice of the New York Supreme Court from 1929 until the end of 1942 when he reached the constitutional age limit. He was appointed official referee of the New York Supreme Court and served from January 7, 1943, until his death in Buffalo, New York.

Sources

1872 births
1952 deaths
Republican Party members of the New York State Assembly
Hartwick College alumni
Republican Party members of the United States House of Representatives from New York (state)
People from Newark, New York